Regina v. Ring, 17 Cox CC. 491, 66 L.T. (NS) 306 (1892), is a criminal case which held that if a pickpocket put his hand in a victim's pocket, but the pocket was empty, he was still guilty of attempted larceny, even though there was nothing to steal, so he was attempting an "impossible" crime.

References

1892 in British law
Law articles needing an infobox